This is a list of politicians from the U.S. state of Ohio.

Current Government and Congressional Delegation

Statewide Elected Executive Officials 
 Governor: Mike DeWine (R)
 Lieutenant Governor: Jon Husted (R)
 Attorney General: Dave Yost (R)
 Auditor of State: Keith Faber (R)
 Secretary of State: Frank LaRose (R)
 Treasurer of State: Robert Sprague (R)

General Assembly Leadership

Senate 

 President of the Senate: Matt Huffman (R)
 President Pro Tempore: Jay Hottinger (R)

 Majority leadership 

 Majority Leader: Kirk Schuring (R)
 Majority Whip: Rob McColley (R)

 Minority leadership

 Minority Leader: Kenny Yuko (D)
 Assistant Minority Leader: Cecil Thomas (D)
 Minority Whip: Nickie Antonio (D)
 Assistant Minority Whip: Tina Maharath (D)

House of Representatives 

 Speaker of the House: Robert Cupp (R)
 Speaker Pro Tempore: Tim Ginter (R)

 Majority leadership 

 Majority Leader: Bill Seitz (R)
 Assistant Majority Leader: Rick Carfagna (R)
 Majority Whip: Don Jones (R)
 Assistant Majority Whip: Cindy Abrams (R)

 Minority leadership

 Minority Leader: Emilia Sykes (D)
 Assistant Minority Leader: Kristin Boggs (D)
 Minority Whip: Paula Hicks-Hudson (D)
 Assistant Minority Whip: Richard Brown (D)

United States Senators 
 1. Sherrod Brown (D)
 3. J. D. Vance (R)

Members of the U.S. House of Representatives 
 : Greg Landsman (D)
 : Brad Wenstrup (R)
 : Joyce Beatty (D)
 : Jim Jordan (R)
 : Bob Latta (R)
 : Bill Johnson (R)
 : Max Miller (R)
 : Warren Davidson (R)
 : Marcy Kaptur (D)
 : Mike Turner (R)
 : Shontel Brown (D)
 : Troy Balderson (R)
 : Emilia Sykes (D)
 : David Joyce (R)
 : Mike Carey (R)

Candidates for Ohio Governor 2010 
1] Governor Ted Strickland [D]

2] John Kasich [R]

3] Todd Kritzwiser [R]

4] Ken Matesz [L] 

5] Bob MacAfee

Election Results, Ohio Governor
Election Results, Ohio Governor (Democratic Primaries)
Election Results, Ohio Governor (Republican Primaries)

Candidates for Ohio Lieutenant Governor 
Election Results, Ohio Lieutenant Governor
Election Results, Ohio Lieutenant Governor (Democratic Primaries)
Election Results, Ohio Lieutenant Governor (Republican Primaries)

Candidates for Ohio Attorney General 
Election Results, Ohio Attorney General
Election Results, Ohio Attorney General (Democratic Primaries)
Election Results, Ohio Attorney General (Republican Primaries)

Candidates for Ohio State Auditor 
Election Results, Ohio State Auditor
Election Results, Ohio State Auditor (Democratic Primaries)
Election Results, Ohio State Auditor (Republican Primaries)

Candidates for Ohio Secretary of State 
Election Results, Ohio Secretary of State
Election Results, Ohio Secretary of State (Democratic Primaries)
Election Results, Ohio Secretary of State (Republican Primaries)

Candidates for Ohio State Treasurer 
Election Results, Ohio State Treasurer
Election Results, Ohio State Treasurer (Democratic Primaries)
Election Results, Ohio State Treasurer (Republican Primaries)

Candidates for the Ohio Supreme Court 
Election Results, Ohio Supreme Court
Election Results, Ohio Supreme Court (Democratic Primaries)
Election Results, Ohio Supreme Court (Republican Primaries)

Candidates for U.S. Senator from Ohio 
Election Results, U.S. Senator from Ohio
Election Results, U.S. Senator from Ohio (Democratic Primaries)
Election Results, U.S. Senator from Ohio (Republican Primaries)

Candidates for U.S. Representative from Ohio 
List of Candidates for U.S. Representative from Ohio
List of Candidates for U.S. Representative from Ohio, A-G
List of Candidates for U.S. Representative from Ohio, H-M
List of Candidates for U.S. Representative from Ohio, N-Z
George H. Bender (R)
Sherrod Brown (D)
Francis W. Durbin (D)
Steve LaTourette (R)
L. L. Marshall (R)
 Election Results, U.S. Representative from Ohio, 1st District
 Election Results, U.S. Representative from Ohio, 2nd District
 Election Results, U.S. Representative from Ohio, 3rd District
 Election Results, U.S. Representative from Ohio, 4th District
 Election Results, U.S. Representative from Ohio, 5th District
 Election Results, U.S. Representative from Ohio, 6th District
 Election Results, U.S. Representative from Ohio, 7th District
 Election Results, U.S. Representative from Ohio, 8th District
 Election Results, U.S. Representative from Ohio, 9th District
 Election Results, U.S. Representative from Ohio, 10th District
 Election Results, U.S. Representative from Ohio, 11th District
 Election Results, U.S. Representative from Ohio, 12th District
 Election Results, U.S. Representative from Ohio, 13th District
 Election Results, U.S. Representative from Ohio, 14th District
 Election Results, U.S. Representative from Ohio, 15th District
 Election Results, U.S. Representative from Ohio, 16th District
 Election Results, U.S. Representative from Ohio, 17th District
 Election Results, U.S. Representative from Ohio, 18th District
 Election Results, U.S. Representative from Ohio, 19th District (to 2000)
 Election Results, U.S. Representative from Ohio, 20th District (to 1990)
 Election Results, U.S. Representative from Ohio, 21st District (to 1990)
 Election Results, U.S. Representative from Ohio, 22nd District (to 1980)
 Election Results, U.S. Representative from Ohio, 23rd District (1952–1980)
 Election Results, U.S. Representative from Ohio, 24th District (1966–1970)
 Election Results, U.S. Representative from Ohio, At-Large Seats (1932–1950 and 1962–1964)

Ohio state senators
See :Category:Ohio state senators
Doris Meinerding (W)

See also
List of governors of Ohio
List of current United States governors 
List of lieutenant governors of Ohio 
List of United States senators from Ohio 
List of current United States senators 
List of United States representatives from Ohio 
List of current members of the U.S. House of Representatives 
United States congressional delegations from Ohio
Supreme Court of Ohio
List of justices of the Ohio Supreme Court
Chief Justice of the Ohio Supreme Court
Ohio General Assembly
Ohio State Senate
Ohio House of Representatives
List of Ohio politicians (by federal office)
List of Ohio politicians (by state office)
List of Ohio politicians (by name)